João Pedro Neves Filipe (born 29 March 1999), known as Jota, is a Portuguese professional footballer who plays as a winger for Scottish Premiership side Celtic.

Born in Lisbon, Jota came through Benfica's youth academy. He began playing for Benfica B in 2018 and was promoted to the first team a year later, but played only a few minutes. He was loaned to La Liga club Real Valladolid in 2020 and Scottish Premiership club Celtic in 2021, winning the league and Scottish League Cup, before joining the club permanently for €7.5 million in the summer of 2022.

Jota is a former Portugal youth international, representing his country at various levels, including the under-17 team that won the 2016 European Championship, the under-19 team that won the 2018 European Championship and the under-21 team that finished as runners-up at the 2021 European Championship.

Club career

Benfica

2017–2019: Early years
Born in Lisbon, Jota started his career at Ginásio de Corroios, before joining Benfica's youth ranks in 2007. He made his debut for the club's B team on 23 January 2016, replacing Dálcio in the 62nd minute in a 2–1 home loss to Varzim. On 18 October 2018, he made his debut for the first team in a 3–0 away win over Sertanense in the third round of the Taça de Portugal. He won the 2017–18 Campeonato Nacional de Juniores and helped the team reach the final of the 2016–17 UEFA Youth League.

On 1 February 2019, Jota was promoted to Benfica's first team, alongside three other Benfica B players. Following his Primeira Liga debut in a 4–0 home win over Chaves on 24 February, he made his European debut on 14 March, as a first choice, in a 3–0 extra time win over Dinamo Zagreb in the second leg of UEFA Europa League round of 16. After failling to impress manager Bruno Lage, Jota was used esporadically and found limited first-team minutes, scoring only two goals in the 2019–20 Taça da Liga against Sporting da Covilhã on 3 December and Vitória de Setúbal on 21 December.

2019–2020: Loan to Valladolid
On 5 October 2020, Jota moved to La Liga side Real Valladolid on loan for the 2020–21 season. On his debut on 22 November he came on as a 77th-minute substiutute for Óscar Plano and scored the final goal of a 3–1 win at Granada, but he added no more goals in 17 games for the rest of the season, which saw the team relegated.

Celtic

2021–22: Breakthrough and Scottish Premiership
On 1 September 2021, Jota joined Scottish Premiership club Celtic on loan for the 2021–22 season, with an option to buy for €7.5 million. Ten days later, he made his debut for Celtic in a 3–0 home win over Ross County, playing the entire game. Jota scored his first goal for the club in a victory against Raith Rovers in the quarter final of the Scottish League Cup on 23 September. He scored his first league goal on 3 October, a late winner in a 2–1 away win to Aberdeen. Having scored six goals in 15 appearances, including two in a 4–2 win at Dundee on 7 November and four assists, he was awarded the SPFL's Player of the Month for both October and November, prompting calls for Celtic to activate the option to buy in his loan contract. On 25 November, Jota scored in a 3–2 away defeat at Bayer 04 Leverkusen in the UEFA Europa League.

A hamstring injury in early December forced him out of the club's League Cup victory against Hibernian. He made his return from injury on 17 January 2022, in a 2–0 home win over Hibernian. After several games without a goal or an assist, on 9 April he assisted Celtic's third goal in a 7–0 win over St Johnstone. In the next matches, Jota scored and assisted twice, earning him the SPFL Player of the Month award for April. On 1 May, he scored his first goal in the Old Firm derby, a 1–1 draw against Rangers at Celtic Park. He finished the season with 13 goals and 14 assists, as the club's top assist provider for the season; 10 of those assists were in the league, the second-highest total, helping Celtic win their 10th Scottish Premiership title in 11 years.

2022–present: Permanent transfer
On 1 July 2022, Celtic triggered Jota's buyout clause of €7.5m (£6.4m), signing him on a permanent five-year deal, with Benfica also receiving 30% of a future transfer. Jota started the 2022–23 season by closing Celtic's 2–0 home win against Aberdeen. On 6 August, he provided a hat-trick of assists for the first time in his career as Celtic beat Ross County 3–1 away from home. On 3 September, he scored a goal with a chip against arch rivals Rangers in a 4–0 win at Parkhead. On 14 September, Jota was named player of the match in Celtic's 1–1 draw against Shakhtar Donetsk in the 2022–23 UEFA Champions League. He scored his first UEFA Champions League goal on 5 October in a 3–1 group stage loss to RB Leipzig.

International career
Jota earned 73 caps and scored 26 goals for Portugal across all youth levels, starting with a 2–1 win for the under-15 team against Switzerland in Campo Maior on 10 June 2014. He went with the under-17 team to the 2016 UEFA European Championship in Azerbaijan, scoring in the penalty shootout win over neighbours Spain in the final.

At the 2017 UEFA European Under-19 Championship in Georgia, Jota was part of the Portugal team that finished runners-up to England. In the final group game, he scored a late penalty as they came back to draw 2–2 with Sweden. He was in the squad for the 2018 tournament, beating Italy 4–3 in the final after extra time. He also finished joint top scorer in the tournament with 5 goals, and was named in the Team of the Tournament.

In March 2021, Jota took part in the 2021 UEFA European Under-21 Championship in Hungary and Slovenia. He scored in extra time as the team beat Italy 5–3 in the quarter-finals at the Stožice Stadium. Portugal finished as runners-up, after losing in the final 1–0 to Germany.

In October 2022, he was included in a provisional squad for the 2022 FIFA World Cup in Qatar, but did not make the final cut.

Career statistics

Club

Honours
Benfica
Primeira Liga: 2018–19
Supertaça Cândido de Oliveira: 2019

Celtic
Scottish Premiership: 2021–22
Scottish League Cup: 2022–23

Portugal U17
UEFA European Under-17 Championship: 2016

Portugal U19
UEFA European Under-19 Championship: 2018; runner-up: 2017

Portugal U21
UEFA European Under-21 Championship runner-up: 2021

Individual
UEFA European Under-17 Championship Team of the Tournament: 2016
UEFA European Under-19 Football Championship Top goalscorer: 2018 (5 goals)
UEFA European Under-19 Championship Team of the Tournament: 2018
LigaPro's Best Young Player of the Month: August 2018
LigaPro's Best Young Player of the Year: 2018–19
SPFL Player of the Month: October 2021, November 2021, April 2022
PFA Scotland Team of the Year (Premiership): 2021–22

References

External links

Living people
1999 births
Portuguese footballers
Footballers from Lisbon
Association football forwards
Portugal under-21 international footballers
Portugal youth international footballers
Liga Portugal 2 players
Primeira Liga players
La Liga players
Scottish Professional Football League players
S.L. Benfica B players
S.L. Benfica footballers
Real Valladolid players
Celtic F.C. players
Portuguese expatriate footballers
Portuguese expatriate sportspeople in Spain
Expatriate footballers in Spain
Portuguese expatriate sportspeople in Scotland
Expatriate footballers in Scotland